Youtab meaning "unique" in Old Persian (4th century BC - 330 BC) was an ancient Persian noblewoman.

She was the sister of Ariobarzanes, Satrap of Persis. She is notable for fighting alongside her brother against Macedonian King Alexander the Great at the Battle of the Persian Gate in the winter of 330 BC.

References

Persian people of the Greco-Persian Wars
330 BC deaths
Year of birth unknown
4th-century BC Iranian people
Women in ancient Near Eastern warfare
4th-century BC women
Opponents of Alexander the Great
Iranian princesses
Military personnel of the Achaemenid Empire killed in action
Women of the Achaemenid Empire
People whose existence is disputed